N47 may refer to:
 N47 (Long Island bus)
 Amurdak language
 BMW N47, an automobile engine
 , a minesweeper of the Royal Norwegian Navy
 Nebraska Highway 47, in the United States
 Pottstown Municipal Airport, in Montgomery County, Pennsylvania, United States